Arts Tower is a 78-storey skyscraper in Avenida Balboa, Panama City, Panama. It is the fifth tallest building in Panama. Construction started in 2008 and was completed in 2013.

Design 
Arts Tower was designed by 'Bettis Tarazi Arquitectos' and is an example of a modern architecture.

Materials 
 Concrete

See also 
 Bicsa Financial Center
 List of tallest buildings in Panama City
 Arts Tower

References 

Skyscrapers in Panama City
Skyscraper office buildings
Residential skyscrapers in Panama City
Residential buildings completed in 2013